The East Anglian Derby is a greyhound competition held at Yarmouth Stadium.

Race history
The event was inaugurated in 1947, when the stadium ran under independent rules. It continued to be a major race on the independent calendar before the stadium switched to National Greyhound Racing Club status. It was first run under NGRC rules in 1975 and is worth £15,000 to the winner today. The prize money level paid today rates the competition as one of the major races on the greyhound calendar.

Charlie Lister OBE has won the event a record twelve times.

Past winners

Location
1975–present - Yarmouth, 462 metres

Sponsors
2008–2010 (Betfair)
2012–2012 (Ladbrokes}
2014–2015 (Totepool)
2017–2017 (Sunbets)
2018–2020 (Racing Post Greyhound TV)
2021–present (BresBet)

References

Greyhound racing competitions in the United Kingdom
Sport in Great Yarmouth
Recurring sporting events established in 1975